A multi-axle bus is a bus or coach that has more than the conventional two  axles (known as a twin-axle bus), usually three (known as a tri-axle bus), or more rarely, four (known as a quad-axle bus).  Extra axles are usually added for legal weight restriction reasons, or to accommodate different vehicle designs such as articulation, or rarely, to implement trailer buses.

History
An early example of a multi-axle bus was a one-off three-axle Crossley Condor, shown here, built for the 1932 Scottish Bus Show.

Reasons for multiple axles

Usually vehicle licensing authorities of different countries will set legal limits on the amount of weight that can be put on each axle.  In the UK, a recent  extension to the legal limit on the length of rigid buses and coaches has led to the increased use of three axles to accommodate the heavier chassis and passenger load.  Certain countries apply exceptions to vehicle rules for specific operations.

Extra axles may also be provided on shorter buses and coaches to accommodate extra equipment loads, such as passenger lifts, or comforts such as toilets, televisions, climate controls. In addition, in some cases the need is bus cargo transport, when large cargo compartments and heavy weight of cargo needs extra axles.

Adding axles to chassis designs is done for specific reasons such as weight or legalities, as having extra axles means extra costs for the operator in terms of tyre replacement, and to an extent, higher fuel consumption.

Rear axle steering
In some buses the rearmost axle is connected to the steering, with the rear most set steering in the opposite direction to the front axle.  This steering arrangement makes it possible for the longer triple axle buses to negotiate corners with greater ease than would otherwise be the case.

Rigid chassis
A bus with a single, rigid chassis, is known as a rigid bus, as opposed to an articulated or bi-articulated bus.

Tri-axle
Tri-axle rigid buses can either be tag-axle buses or twin steer buses.

A twin steer bus is a rare type of tri-axled bus; where the double axles are in the front and steer, as in the Bedford VAL or Bustech CDi.

By far the most common type of tri-axle rigid bus is the tag-axle bus with one axle at the front for steering, and two axles at the back; the main drive axle and a trailing non-drive axle.

Tri-axle double-decker buses are common in high capacity operating environments where articulated buses are not used, such as Hong Kong and Singapore.  Tri-axle buses also see high volume use in Dublin, Ireland.  Imported tri-axle buses were used initially by Megabus for high capacity low cost intercity travel in the UK.

Tri-axle double decker coaches have been used to accommodate the extra weight.  Models are also being introduced on high capacity inter-city routes, such as by the operator Megabus.

Quad-axle

The Neoplan Megaliner was the first quad axle double decker coach, and is used in Japan.  Further examples include the Scania K380IB 8x2.

Articulated chassis

Tri-axle is the standard arrangement of two part articulated buses.

Quad-axle arrangement is sometimes employed on articulated buses to accommodate the extra weight of coach bodies, such as in this quad axle articulated coach Volvo Articulated Coach, and the quad axle double deck articulated coach, the Neoplan Jumbocruiser.  Quad-axle arrangement is also the exclusive arrangement for three part bi-articulated buses.

A rare reason why a bus may have multiple axles is in the case of a trailer bus, where the bus passenger cabin is built as a body semi-trailer towed by a separate tractor unit.

See also

 BRTS
 Bus
 Coach (bus)
 List of buses
 Trailer bus

References

External links

Buses by type